Darren Bradshaw (born 5 November 1980) is an Australian rules footballer who played for the Brisbane Lions in the Australian Football League (AFL).

Bradshaw joined Brisbane from Wodonga, during their run of three successive premierships. As a result, he found it difficult to break into the team, playing his first and only AFL game when his brother and fellow forward Daniel Bradshaw was omitted. In a win over Richmond at Docklands in 2002, Bradshaw had just three disposals and was delisted at the end of the year.

Recruited by South Australian National Football League (SANFL) club West Adelaide in 2003, Bradshaw kicked 88 goals after the home and away season to win the Ken Farmer Medal and booted 97 goals in total, after appearing in a Grand Final loss to Central District. He also won West Adelaide's Best & Fairest award. He currently plays for Howlong in the Hume Football League

References

Holmesby, Russell and Main, Jim (2007). The Encyclopedia of AFL Footballers. 7th ed. Melbourne: Bas Publishing.

1980 births
Living people
Brisbane Lions players
West Adelaide Football Club players
Wodonga Football Club players
Australian rules footballers from Victoria (Australia)